The Ministry of Economic Affairs and Climate Policy (EZK) is the Netherlands' ministry responsible for international trade, commercial, industrial, investment, technology, energy, nuclear, renewable energy, environmental, climate change, natural resource, mining, space policy, as well as tourism.

The Ministry was created in 1905 as the Ministry of Agriculture, Industry and Commerce and has had several name changes before it became the Ministry of Economic Affairs in 1946. In 2010 the Ministry of Agriculture, Nature and Food Quality was merged with the Ministry of Economic Affairs, which was renamed as the Ministry of Economic Affairs, Agriculture and Innovation. In 2012 the name was reverted as the Ministry of Economic Affairs but kept the responsibilities of the former Ministry of Agriculture. In 2017, the Ministry of Agriculture, Nature and Food Quality was reinstated but the Ministry of Economic Affairs took on several of the environmental policies portfolios from the Ministry of Infrastructure and the Environment, which was renamed Ministry of Infrastructure and Water Management. The Ministry of Economic Affairs was renamed Ministry of Economic Affairs and Climate Policy.

The Minister of Economic Affairs and Climate Policy is the head of the Ministry and a member of the Cabinet of the Netherlands. The current Minister is Micky Adriaansens of the People's Party for Freedom and Democracy (VVD) who has been in office since 10 January 2022.

Organisation
The Ministry has currently five Government Agencies and several Directorates:

Mission
The mission of the Ministry is to "promote sustainable economic growth in the Netherlands." It focuses on the key areas of "Knowledge economy and innovation," "Competition and dynamic" and "Room to do business."

Organization
The political responsibility of the ministry is in the hands of the Minister of Economic Affairs and Climate Policy who is part of the Dutch Cabinet. A Deputy Minister, called the State Secretary, serves as the second-in-command to the Minister.

The Ministry of Economic Affairs and Climate Policy has also a civil service department, led by the Secretary-General and Deputy Secretary-General. The Ministry of Economic Affairs and Climate Policy consists of four Directorates-General: Foreign Economic Relations, Economic Policy, Energy and Telecom, and Enterprise and Innovation. There are also some support departments.

Litigation

In June 2015, following a lawsuit filed by the NGO Urgenda, the Hague District Court found that the Ministry was unlawfully violating its duty of care under the European Convention on Human Rights by failing to adequately address climate change and ordered the government to reduce green house gas emissions.  Instead, the Ministry appealed to the Hague Court of Appeal, which ruled against the Ministry in October 2018. The Ministry has appealed to the Supreme Court of the Netherlands, where the court's Advocate and Procurator Generals have recommenced it rule against the Ministry.

See also
 List of Ministers of Economic Affairs of the Netherlands

References

External links
  Ministerie van Economische Zaken en Klimaat Rijksoverheid.nl

Government ministries of the Netherlands
Netherlands
Netherlands
Netherlands
Netherlands
Netherlands
Environment of the Netherlands
Netherlands
Netherlands
Netherlands
Netherlands
Netherland
Netherlands
Netherlands, Economic Affairs
1905 establishments in the Netherlands